2003 hurricane season may refer to: 

 2003 Atlantic hurricane season
 2003 Pacific hurricane season